Metarbela fumida is a moth in the family Cossidae. It is found in Togo.

References

Natural History Museum Lepidoptera generic names catalog

Metarbelinae
Moths described in 1896